Emil Kiszka (5 December 1926 – 9 February 2007) was a Polish sprinter. He competed in the men's 100 metres at the 1952 Summer Olympics.

Competition record

References

1926 births
2007 deaths
Athletes (track and field) at the 1952 Summer Olympics
Polish male sprinters
Olympic athletes of Poland
Place of birth missing